The Nuova Accademia di Belle Arti, "New Academy of Fine Arts", also known as NABA, is a private academy of fine art in Milan, in Lombardy in northern Italy. It has approximately 3000 students, some of whom are from abroad; it participates in the Erasmus Programme.

History

NABA was founded in Milan in 1980.

In 1994 the Nuova Accademia received one of the forty "Ambrogino" certificates of civic merit awarded each year by the Comune of Milan.

In 2008 NABA began hosting a "node" of the Planetary-Collegium research platform of the University of Plymouth.

NABA was bought by Bastogi Spa of Milan in 2002. In December 2009 Bastogi sold it to Laureate Education of Baltimore, Maryland, for €22 million.

The school is listed by the Ministero dell'Istruzione, dell'Università e della Ricerca, the Italian ministry of education, as a "legally recognised academy" in the AFAM classification of schools of music, art and dance that are considered equivalent to a traditional university.

References

Art schools in Italy
Fashion schools
Design schools in Italy
Communication design
Graphic design schools
Education in Milan
Higher education in Italy
Educational institutions established in 1980
1980 establishments in Italy